The Friedrichshafen FF.67 was a German experimental floatplane produced by Flugzeugbau Friedrichshafen.

Development and design
The FF.67 was an experimental monoplane floatplane powered by one Mercedes D.IV. Its first flight took place in December 1918, a month after the Armistice.

Specifications

See also

References

Bibliography

1910s German experimental aircraft
Floatplanes
FF.67
Single-engined tractor aircraft
Aircraft first flown in 1918